Centre for Culture and Technology may refer to:

 former name of the  McLuhan Program in Culture and Technology
 The Centre for Culture and Technology (CCAT) at Curtin University